Cyrtorchis is a genus of flowering plants from the orchid family Orchidaceae native to Africa.

Description
The species of the genus Cyrtorchis are epiphytic or lithophytic herbs, which do not have pseudobulbs. The white, fragrant, star-shaped flowers are distinctly spurred.

Cytology
The diploid chromosome count of Cyrtorchis arcuata is 2n = 46.

Physiology
Cyrtorchis is known to utilize the crassulacean acid metabolism, which entails photosynthesis during the daytime, and gaseous exchange through open stomata during the night. This enables the plant to save water.

Etymology
The generic name Cyrtorchis is composed of the Greek words "kirtos" meaning curved and "orchis" meaning testicles, which refers to orchids.

Taxonomy
The genus has been proven to be monophyletic.

Sections
The genus has been divided into the sections Cyrtorchis section Homocolleticon Summerh. and Cyrtorchis section Cyrtorchis based on differences in the shape of the viscidium. Originally the section Cyrtorchis was published as section Heterocolleticon Summerh., but it is now known as Cyrtorchis section Cyrtorchis.  The section Homocolleticon is characterized by an uniformly textured viscidium, in contrast to the viscidium of section Cyrtorchis, which consists of two distinct zones.

The section Homocolleticon Summerh. was elevated to a genus by Szlach. & Olszewski in 2001, but Homocolleticon (Summerh.) Szlach. & Olszewski is now a synonym of Cyrtorchis Schltr.

Species
As of December 2022, there are 19 currently accepted species:
 Cyrtorchis arcuata (Lindl.) Schltr.
 Cyrtorchis aschersonii (Kraenzl.) Schltr.
 Cyrtorchis brownii (Rolfe) Schltr.
 Cyrtorchis chailluana (Hook.f.) Schltr.
 Cyrtorchis crassifolia Schltr. in R.E.Fries
 Cyrtorchis erythraeae (Rolfe) Schltr.
 Cyrtorchis glaucifolia Summerh.
 Cyrtorchis guillaumetii (Pérez-Vera) R.Rice
 Cyrtorchis hamata (Rolfe) Schltr.
 Cyrtorchis henriquesiana (Ridl.) Schltr.
 Cyrtorchis injoloensis (De Wild.) Schltr.
 Cyrtorchis letouzeyi Szlach. & Olszewski
 Cyrtorchis monteiroae (Rchb.f.) Schltr.
 Cyrtorchis neglecta Summerh.
 Cyrtorchis okuensis Droissart, Azandi & M.Simo
 Cyrtorchis praetermissa Summerh.
 Cyrtorchis ringens (Rchb.f.) Summerh
 Cyrtorchis seretii (De Wild.) Schltr.
 Cyrtorchis submontana Stévart, Droissart & Azandi

Species formerly placed in Cyrtorchis
Cyrtorchis cufodontii Chiov. is now considered to be a synonym of Ypsilopus amaniensis (Kraenzl.) D'haijère & Stévart
Cyrtorchis refracta (Kraenzl.) Schltr. is now considered to be a synonym of Ancistrorhynchus refractus (Kraenzl.) Summerh.

Ecology

Habitat
It grows in dense forests and rainforests, as well as in plantations. It is found growing on tree trunks and branches, which receive high levels of sunlight. In addition to epiphytic growth, it can also grow lithophytically attached to rocks.

Pollination
Several hawk moth species of the genus Hippotion have been identified as likely pollinators of Cyrtorchis okuensis.
The white flowers shift to an orange pollination after pollination or senescence. Such post-pollination behaviour is not uncommon, and it may be explained by a reduced attractivity of flowers to pollinators, if the flowers are no longer viable.

Conservation
Two species, namely Cyrtorchis letouzeyi Szlach. & Olszewski and Cyrtorchis henriquesiana (Ridl.) Schltr., have been categorized as species of least concern (LC) under the IUCN Red List criteria. Cyrtorchis arcuata subsp. arcuata has been categorized as a Least Concern species by the Red List of South African Plants. Another species, Cyrtorchis glaucifolia Summerh., has been cagegorized as an endangered (EN) species under the IUCN Red List criteria, and Cyrtorchis okuensis Droissart, Azandi & M.Simo is categorized as Near Threatened (NT).

Horticulture
Cyrtorchis is easy to cultivate in well drained substrate. Cyrtorchis arcuata is most commonly found in private collections.

See also 
 List of Orchidaceae genera

References

External links 

Vandeae genera
Angraecinae
Orchids of Africa
Flora of Africa
Epiphytic orchids
Lithophytic orchids